|}

The Cork Stayers Novice Hurdle is a Grade 3 National Hunt novice hurdle in Ireland which is open to horses aged four years or older. 
The race is run at Cork over a distance of about 3 miles (4,828 metres) and during its running there are 13 hurdles to be jumped. It is scheduled to take place each year in December. It is currently sponsored by the Kerry Group.

The race was first run in 1998 and was awarded Grade 3 status in 2003.

Records
Most successful jockey (2 wins):
 Paul Carberry – Boley Lad (1999), Road To Riches (2012)
 Davy Condon - Homer Wells (2004), Corbally Ghost (2011) 
 Paul Townend - 	Quel Esprit (2009), Black Hercules (2014) 

Most successful trainer (5 wins): 
 Noel Meade -  Boley Lad (1999), Parsons Pistol (2007), Corbally Ghost (2011), Road To Riches (2012), Rathnure Rebel (2016) 
 Willie Mullins – Homer Wells (2004), Quel Esprit (2009), Black Hercules (2014), Gangster (2015), Fabulous Saga (2017)

Winners

See also
 Horse racing in Ireland
 List of Irish National Hunt races

References
Racing Post:

National Hunt races in Ireland
National Hunt hurdle races
Cork Racecourse
Recurring sporting events established in 1998
1998 establishments in Ireland